The 2020–21 season was the club's 107th season in existence and the third consecutive season in the top flight of Greek football. In addition to the domestic league, Aris Thessaloniki participate in the Greek Football Cup and in the UEFA Europa League, from which they were eliminated in the second qualifying round by Ukrainian club Kolos Kovalivka.

Aris changed managers in September, following the elimination in the Europa League, hiring Akis Mantzios

First-team squad

Transfers and loans

Transfers in

Transfers out

Loans in

Loans Out

Transfer summary

Spending

Summer:  1.460.000 €

Winter:  0 €

Total:  1.460.000 €

Income

Summer:  1.100.000 €

Winter:  0 €

Total:  1.100.000 €

Net Expenditure

Summer:  360.000 €

Winter:  0 €

Total:  360.000 €

Competitions

Overall

Overview

{| class="wikitable" style="text-align: center"
|-
!rowspan=2|Competition
!colspan=8|Record
|-
!
!
!
!
!
!
!
!
|-
| Super League 1

|-
| Greek Cup

|-
| Europa League

|-
! Total

{| class="wikitable" style="text-align: center"
|-
!rowspan=2|Super League 1
!colspan=8|Record
|-
!
!
!
!
!
!
!
!
|-
| Regular Season

|-
| Play-off Round

|-
! Total

Managers' overview

Michael Oenning
{| class="wikitable" style="text-align: center"
|-
!rowspan=2|Competition
!colspan=8|Record
|-
!
!
!
!
!
!
!
!
|-
| Super League 1

|-
| Greek Cup

|-
| Europa League

|-
! Total

Apostolos Terzis
{| class="wikitable" style="text-align: center"
|-
!rowspan=2|Competition
!colspan=8|Record
|-
!
!
!
!
!
!
!
!
|-
| Super League 1

|-
| Greek Cup

|-
| Europa League

|-
! Total

Akis Mantzios
{| class="wikitable" style="text-align: center"
|-
!rowspan=2|Competition
!colspan=8|Record
|-
!
!
!
!
!
!
!
!
|-
| Super League 1

|-
| Greek Cup

|-
| Europa League

|-
! Total

Super League 1

Regular season

League table

Results summary

Results by matchday
In this table the position of team is updated after every matchday. Results of postponed matches are not included in the round which they were originally scheduled, but the position is being updated at the round where the match was played chronologically. For example, the match against AEL for 6th round postponed and reprogrammed between round 10 and round 11 so the position (after the win) was updated in 10th round

Matches

Play-off Round

League table

<onlyinclude>

Results summary

Results by matchday

Matches

Greek Football Cup

Sixth Round

Quarter-finals

UEFA Europa League

Aris Thessaloniki finished 5th in the 2019–20 Super League Greece and entered the competition in the Second qualifying round. Due to the COVID-19 pandemic all qualifying matches were played as single leg matches, hosted by one of the teams decided by draw, and were played behind closed doors.

Second qualifying round

Squad statistics

Appearances

Goals

Clean sheets

Players' awards

NIVEA MEN Best Goal (Super League 1)

NIVEA MEN Player of the Month (Super League 1)

References

External links

Aris Thessaloniki F.C. seasons
Aris
Aris